Hélène Bouchiat (born 1958) is a French condensed matter physicist specializing in mesoscopic physics and nanoscience. She is a director of research in the French National Centre for Scientific Research (CNRS), associated with the Laboratoire de Physique des Solides at Paris-Sud University. Topics in her research include supercurrents, persistent currents, graphene, carbon nanotubes, and bismuth-based topological insulators.

Education and career
Bouchiat is the daughter of physicists Marie-Anne Bouchiat and Claude Bouchiat, and was a student at the École normale supérieure. With the exception of an 18-month postdoctoral research visit at Bell Labs, she has spent her entire career with the CNRS.

Recognition
Bouchiat is a member of the French Academy of Sciences, elected in 2010. The academy also gave her their Anatole and Suzanne Abragam Prize in 1994, and their  in 1998. She won the CNRS bronze and silver medals in 1987 and 2007 respectively.

References

1958 births
Living people
French physicists
French women physicists
Condensed matter physicists
Members of the French Academy of Sciences
Research directors of the French National Centre for Scientific Research